Mechling Run is a  long 1st order tributary to Harmon Creek in Brooke County, West Virginia.  This is the only stream of this name in the United States.

Variant names
According to the Geographic Names Information System, it has also been known historically as:
Meckling Run

Course
Mechling Run rises about 1.5 miles southeast of Colliers, West Virginia, and then flows northwest to join Harmon Creek at Colliers.

Watershed
Mechling Run drains  of area, receives about 40.2 in/year of precipitation, has a wetness index of 295.76, and is about 83% forested.

See also
List of rivers of West Virginia

References

Rivers of West Virginia
Rivers of Brooke County, West Virginia